The yellow-spotted tropical night lizard or yellow-spotted night lizard (Lepidophyma flavimaculatum) is a species of night lizard. It is distributed from central Mexico through the Central America south to Panama. It includes four subspecies:
 Lepidophyma flavimaculatum flavimaculatum
 Lepidophyma flavimaculatum ophiophthalmum
 Lepidophyma flavimaculatum tehuanae
 Lepidophyma flavimaculatum tenebrarum

Reproduction
It reproduces parthenogenetically, and gives birth to fully developed young lizards. Before birth the eggs are not fertilized.

Habitat and ecology
It is a secretive, terrestrial and nocturnal lizard of tropical wet and moist forests. Mostly found on the ground, it is occasionally found on tree trunks or beneath bark on standing trees. It feeds on small invertebrates.

The lizard secretes an extremely potent venom from its tongue, although the venom is treatable for humans.

Fiction
The yellow-spotted night lizard is the inspiration for the lizards of the same name in the children's novel Holes by Louis Sachar.  However, in the making of the movie adaptation of the novel, they used bearded dragons and painted yellow spots on them, rather than using actual yellow-spotted night lizards.  In both versions, the lizards are portrayed as animals that are aggressive toward humans and produce deadly venom.  Within the plot of the story, a bite from one is described as "the worst thing that can happen to you". Although this depiction is not fully accurate, the real species is still extremely venomous.

References

Yellow-spotted night lizard
Lizards of North America
Vertebrate parthenogenesis
Reptiles of Belize
Reptiles of Costa Rica
Reptiles of Guatemala
Reptiles of Honduras
Reptiles of Mexico
Reptiles of Nicaragua
Reptiles of Panama
Yellow-spotted night lizard
Yellow-spotted night lizard